Brainless may refer to:

 "Brainless", a 1995 song by The Urge, from the album Receiving the Gift of Flavor
 "Brainless", a 2013 song by Eminem, from the album The Marshall Mathers LP 2
 "Brainless", an episode of Round the Twist, 2000

See also
 Anencephaly, the absence of a major portion of the brain, skull, and scalp that occurs during embryonic development.